Jacob Hansford (born 28 September 1995) is an Australian swimmer. He competed in the men's 4 × 200 metre freestyle relay event at the 2016 Summer Olympics.

References

External links
 

1995 births
Living people
Sportsmen from New South Wales
Olympic swimmers of Australia
Swimmers at the 2016 Summer Olympics
Universiade medalists in swimming
Universiade silver medalists for Australia
Universiade bronze medalists for Australia
Medalists at the 2015 Summer Universiade
Medalists at the 2019 Summer Universiade
Australian male freestyle swimmers
20th-century Australian people
21st-century Australian people
Swimmers from Sydney